Pelt is the eighth studio album by the drone rock band Pelt. It was released on July 19, 2005 through VHF Records.

Track listing

Personnel 
Pelt
Patrick Best – instruments
Mikel Dimmick – instruments
Mike Gangloff – vocals, instruments
Jack Rose – instruments

References 

2005 albums
Pelt (band) albums
VHF Records albums